Styposis is a genus of comb-footed spiders that was first described by Eugène Louis Simon in 1894. It is a senior synonym of Cyatholipulus.

Comb-footed spiders usually have eight eyes, but most species have six large eyes, with the anterior median eyes extremely small or absent entirely. Members of Comaroma also have six eyes, but also have a large colulus  and are less sclerotized.

Species
 it contains fourteen species, found in Central America, South America, the Congo, the United States, and Puerto Rico:
Styposis ajo Levi, 1960 – USA
Styposis albula (Gertsch, 1960) – Guyana
Styposis camoteensis (Levi, 1967) – Chile (Juan Fernandez Is.)
Styposis chickeringi Levi, 1960 – Panama
Styposis clausis Levi, 1960 – USA to Colombia
Styposis colorados Levi, 1964 – Ecuador
Styposis flavescens Simon, 1894 (type) – Nicaragua to Venezuela
Styposis kahuziensis Miller, 1970 – Congo
Styposis lutea (Petrunkevitch, 1930) – Puerto Rico
Styposis nicaraguensis Levi, 1960 – Nicaragua
Styposis rancho Levi, 1960 – Venezuela
Styposis scleropsis Levi, 1960 – Panama
Styposis selis Levi, 1964 – Brazil
Styposis tepus (Levi, 1967) – Chile

See also
 List of Theridiidae species

References

Further reading

Araneomorphae genera
Theridiidae